Kotwa is a census town in Varanasi district in the Indian state of Uttar Pradesh.

Demographics

 India census, Kotwa had a population of 12,411. Males constitute 53% of the population and females 47%. Kotwa has an average literacy rate of 39%, lower than the national average of 59.5%: male literacy is 47%, and female literacy is 30%. In Kotwa, 23% of the population is under 6 years of age.

References

Census towns in Varanasi district
Cities and towns in Varanasi district